The Codex coemeterium (sb423 National Library, Clementinum, Prague) is a 16th-century grimoire manuscript. The text, composed in Latin, is largely concerned with demonology and necromancy. The book falls into A.E. Waite's category of 'Unprinted literature of ceremonial magic' though extracted elements have been reproduced in later treatises. It is heavily based on the Key of Solomon, which was listed in the Catholic Church's index of prohibited books.

References

16th-century books
Manuscripts
Divination
Demonological literature